Henning Christophersen (8 November 1939 – 31 December 2016) was a Danish politician, a former Vice President of the European Commission (1985–1995), former leader of the Danish liberal party Venstre (1978–1984) and former member of the European Convention. Christophersen was one of the early architects of the Single Market and the Euro.

Life
Christophersen was born in Copenhagen. He was Deputy Prime minister and Finance Minister of Denmark (1982–1984) and Foreign Minister of Denmark (1978–1979).

During his time as Vice President of the European Commission for Budget and later for Economic & Financial Affairs, Christophersen decisively contributed to the preparations of the launch of the Euro and of the Economic & Monetary Union.  Through his pioneering work on Transeuropean Networks, he also played a big role in the realization of the Internal Market.

In 1992, as EU commissioner, Christophersen together with 10 Baltic Ministers of Foreign Affairs founded the Council of the Baltic Sea States (CBSS) and the EuroFaculty.

He was the Chairman of the Energy Charter Conference 1998 until 2007.

He was Chairman and member of a number of Supervisory Boards of Directors, and a Partner of Kreab, Brussels.

Christophersen died on 31 December 2016 in Brussels at the age of 77 after a short illness.

References

Sources
 Tom Matz (2004), Venstre ved du hvor du har  ForlagsKompagniet : Nørhaven Book.

1939 births
2016 deaths
Danish Finance Ministers
Foreign ministers of Denmark
Danish European Commissioners
Members of the Folketing
Politicians from Copenhagen
European Commissioners 1985–1988
Leaders of Venstre (Denmark)
20th-century Danish politicians